Indian environmental law concerns the law and policy of India concerning the protection of the environment, measures taken to reverse climate change and achieve a zero carbon economy.

Since the sixties concern over the state of environment has grown the world over. There has been substantive decline in environment quality due to increasing pollution, loss of vegetal cover and biological diversity, excessive concentration of harmful chemicals in the ambient atmosphere and in food chains, growing risks of environment accidents and threats to life support systems. The Decision which were taken at united nation conference on the human conference on the Human Environment held in Stockholm in June 1972 were based on the world community's resolve to protect and enhance the environmental concerns. Although several measures had been taken for environmental Protection both before and after the Conference it was found necessary to enact a comprehensive law on the subject to implement the decision of the 
conference. Accordingly the Environment (Protection) Bill passed was introduced in the Parliament Various different areas of environmental protection have been covered by different laws, drawn up at different times.

Some of the areas covered include :-
 Air pollution 
 Water pollution 
 Forest and wildlife protection 
 Waste management 
 Wild Life

As with environmental protection legislation in many countries, the regulations are only effective if they are properly enforced, which hasn't always been the case in India, for a number of reasons, some of which are down to local administrative authorities.

Because of the huge population of India, there have been enormous demands placed on the environment, with the regulations not proving to be entirely satisfactory in dealing with the tremendous pressures.

History

General protection
The Environment Protection Act, 1986. is enforced by the Central Pollution Control Board and the numerous State Pollution Control Boards.
The National Green Tribunal established under the National Green Tribunal Act of 2010 has jurisdiction over all environmental cases dealing with a substantial environmental question and acts covered under the Water (Prevention and Control of Pollution) Act, 1974.
The Public Liability Insurance Act, 1991 
National Green Tribunal Act

Air pollution
The Air (Prevention and Control of Pollution) Act, 1981
Air (Prevention and Control of Pollution) (Union Territories) Rules, 1983

Water
Legislation to protect water quality include: 
The Water (Prevention and Control of Pollution) Act, 1974
The Water (Prevention and Control of Pollution) Cess Act, 1977
Water (Prevention and Control of Pollution) Cess Rules, 1978
Ganga Action Plan, 1986
National Water Policy
Coastal Regulation Zone
Godavari Water Disputes Tribunal
Interstate River Water Disputes Act
Krishna Water Disputes Tribunal

Forests and wildlife
Indian Forest Act, 1927
Wild life protection act, 1972
Forest (Conservation) Act, 1980
National Forest Policy, 1988
M. C. Mehta v. Kamal Nath (1997) 1 SCC 388
Biological Diversity Act, 2002 
Protection of Plant Varieties and Farmers' Rights Act, 2001
Wild Life Protection Act, 1972, which does not fall within the jurisdiction of the National Green Tribunal. Appeals can be filed in the Supreme Court of India.
Prevention of Cruelty to Animals Act 1960

CAMPA bill

Waste management
Batteries (Management and Handling) Rules, 2001
Recycled Plastics, Plastics Manufacture and Usage Rules, 1999
Basel Convention on Control of TransboundaryMovements on Hazardous Wastes and Their Disposal, 1989 and Its Protocols
Hazardous Wastes (Management and Handling) Amendment Rules, 2003
Construction and Demolition Waste Management Rules, 2016

See also
Environmental policy of the European Union
Environmental law
United Kingdom environmental law
United States environmental law
Environmental policy in China
ASME’s 2019 Advanced Clean Energy Summit - Nuclear Power’s Role in Combating Climate Change

Notes

References

Further reading
 Saravanan, Velayutham. Environmental History of Modern India: Land, Population, Technology and Development (Bloomsbury Publishing India, 2022) online review[

Environmental law
Environmental social science
Environmental protection
Environmental law in India